Alpha-isomethyl ionone is a synthetically made and naturally occurring organic compound found in Brewer's yeasts or the species known as Saccharomyces cerevisiae. The compound is an isomer of methyl ionone. Alpha-isomethyl ionone can be colorless or pale-straw coloured liquid. Its primary scent is flowery and secondary scent is violet. It may also have a woody or orris-like scent. and is often used in flavouring and cosmetic industries for example, aftershave lotions, bath products, hair care products, moisturizers, perfumes, shampoos and skin care products. It is also an ingredient used in Chanel No. 5, and other branded products such as Fidji by Guy Laroche. Perfume fragrances that alpha-isomethyl ionone is used in are for example, amber, chypre, violet, mimosa, reseda, iris, orris, cyclamen, chypre, berries, woody notes, ylang-ylang, leather, orange, nut, pistachio, muscatel, and tobacco.

Properties 

Alpha-isomethyl ionone would be classified as a norsesquiterpenoid, having 14 carbon atoms (1 less than the 15 of three consecutive isoprene units). It is an extremely weak base, the calculated pKa values within the molecule being 19.7 (strongest acidic) and -4.8 (strongest basic). The percentage of alpha-isomethyl ionone used in perfumes is approximately ranging from 0.1% to 11.9%, with an average of 1.1%. For example, it is usually used in conjunction with hydroxycitronellal, woody notes, copaiba, N-methyl ionone, ionone, or Vetiver.

Synthesis 
The synthesis of alpha-isomethyl ionone involves a cross-aldol condensation of citral with methyl ethyl ketone A high temperature and strong alkali is used. The ratio between the n-form and iso-form is controlled in order to obtain methyl pseudo-ionone and allow ring formation to occur. Iso-forms is then synthesized consequently.

References 

Perfume ingredients
Flavors
Enones
Cyclohexenes